The title I'm Not Your Steppin' Stone may refer to:

"(I'm Not Your) Steppin' Stone", a song recorded by Paul Revere & the Raiders, and The Monkees
I'm Not Your Steppin' Stone: Shameless, a manga series